Field order may refer to:
 A type of playback for interlaced video
 A way of presenting information about a military situation in the field, as in the five paragraph field order
 The order (size) of a finite field